Andrew Arthur Rowland (born 8 September 1954) is an English former footballer who played for Derby County, Bury and Swindon Town.

References

1954 births
Living people
Footballers from Derby
English footballers
Association football defenders
Association football forwards
Derby County F.C. players
Bury F.C. players
Swindon Town F.C. players
English Football League players
English football managers
Swindon Town F.C. managers
Swindon Town F.C. non-playing staff